Abaiba is a genus of beetles in the family Cerambycidae, containing a single species, Abaiba dimorphica.

References

Necydalopsini
Monotypic Cerambycidae genera